Yangebup is a southern suburb of Perth, Western Australia in the City of Cockburn. It takes its name from the nearby Yangebup Lake.

History 
The name Yangebup was first recorded in 1841 and may be derived from the Aboriginal word, Yanget, for the species of native flax or bullrush found around the lake.  It was approved as the name for the suburb in 1977.

Geography 
It is bounded by the freight rail line and North Lake Road to the north, Hammond Road to the east, Beeliar Drive to the south and Stock Road to the west.

Community services

Yangebup Progress Association 
The Yangebup Progress Association is the local residents' group in Yangebup; it meets on a monthly basis at the Yangebup Family Centre.

Child health nurse 
Yangebup also has a child health nurse clinic located at the Yangebup Family Centre, which offers a range of services for families with babies and young children.

Facilities

Education 
Yangebup has two primary schools: Yangebup Primary School and Mater Christi Catholic Primary School.

Recreation 
Yangebup Lake and Little Rush Lake, which forms part of the Beeliar Regional Park are located within the area. There are also several local parks in the area including:
 Ronsard Park
 Visco Park
 Levi Park, which is mainly bushland and enclosed dog exercise area
 Pereena Roche Reserve, which includes a long scenic path and a small duck lake, as well as several playgrounds
 Milgun Reserve, containing several playgrounds
 Nicholson Reserve, which serves as Yangebup Primary School's oval, and is also where the local football teams have their clubrooms

Medical 
Yangebup has a medical centre, chemist and dental clinic located at the shopping centre on Swallow Drive. There is also a Child Health Nurse located at the Yangebup Family Centre on Dunraven Drive.

Vet 
Yangebup has a vet clinic at the shopping centre on Swallow Drive.

References

External links

Suburbs of Perth, Western Australia
Swan Coastal Plain
Suburbs in the City of Cockburn